is a fighting video game developed and published by Arc System Works. It is the seventh mainline installment of the Guilty Gear series, and the 25th overall. The game was released for PlayStation 4, PlayStation 5 and Windows in June 2021, for Japanese arcades in July 2021, and for Xbox One and Xbox Series X/S in March 2023.

Guilty Gear Strive received generally positive reviews from critics, who praised its visuals, gameplay and netcode, and has sold over one million units as of August 2022.

Gameplay
Intended as a "complete reconstruction of the franchise", Guilty Gear Strive retains the core essence of the series but revamps many features and mechanics, except for the removal of the series’ signature mechanic, the Instant Kill. It introduces the "Wall Break" feature, which allows for stage transitions when a combo is initiated in the corner of the arena.

Synopsis

Main Story

The story continues after the events of Guilty Gear Xrd. It is the conclusion of Sol Badguy's story (A.K.A. The Gear Hunters Saga), set in Washington, D.C., featuring his final confrontation with That Man, Asuka R. Kreutz.

Three weeks after the events of Guilty Gear Xrd, I-No frees the powerful magic-user Happy Chaos from the body of former Sanctus Populi, Ariels, who is imprisoned inside a special holding cell in Illyria. Chaos notes that she is physically incapable of feeling desire, then offers to help her find her “other half” so he can enjoy some drama. Asuka turns himself in to the US president Colin Vernon E. Groubitz, intending to join the White House's G4 peace summit from a holding cell and ask the other nations for assistance in ridding the world of the Tome of Origin and Sol Badguy. The world's leaders fear an attack from I-No and hire knights from each country, including Sol Badguy, now the world's renowned Gear hero who remains a bounty hunter. Sol and his second lover, Jack-O', plan to refuse, but accept after noting Ariels' warning about I-No and Chaos' plot. After releasing and brainwashing the samurai Nagoriyuki at an Illyrian town, I-No dares Axl Low to erase her, then surrenders herself to the Illyria police, convincing the world that it is safe to hold the summit. However, Sol and Jack-O notice something wrong and chase Chaos, assisted by Chipp Zanuff and Anji Mito, but are stopped by Nagoriyuki and Chaos' eerie nature, and realise that Chaos created weapons from materials from Nagoriyuki's blade which can kill Gears and other immortal beings. During an interrogation, I-No says she remembers a kind blonde man but thinks the memory never happened and asks if Jack-O' will ever find her "place" in the world. In private, Jack-O' reveals to Sol and Ky Kiske that I-No is "incomplete" and needs to join with her other half to achieve godhood. She suggests sacrificing herself to turn I-No into a regular human, but Sol refuses to entertain the thought.

Realizing something will happen at G4, Sol leaves for the US with the third Illyrian King Daryl, while former assassins turned leaders of reformed groups Milla Rage and Zato-1 are enlisted by Daryl to accompany the second Illyrian King Leo Whitefang in investigating the mysteries within the White House, then Ky and Jack-O' depart on an airship when the summit occurs. Chaos brainwashes the White House guards and holds the dignitaries such as Daryl hostage, though Sol and Vernon, the only ones who can open Asuka's cell, manage to escape and request reinforcements from other allied forces like Zepp and Illyria. After Chaos activates the White House's aircraft mode, "Tír na nÓg", Asuka realizes Chaos is "the original," the man responsible for bringing magic to the world and Asuka's former teacher. After learning what Chaos will do with the Tome, Daryl manages to convince the fallen sorcerer to release him and the rest of the dignitaries barring Vernon, Sol, and Asuka, including US' surviving agent, Giovanna. Shortly, Chipp and Anji sneak into the Department of Defense to confirm their allies of Chaos' other identity as another That Man, and the true culprit who had orchestrated the ongoing Crusaders since Asuka's initial firing, then theorize that Chaos intends to fly the White House into Mexico, where it will be shot down, so Chaos can dig the Tome out of the ashes. Sol confronts Nagoriyuki in an attempt to learn Chaos' weakness, but Nagoriyuki lets himself be defeated and is freed from Chaos' control, and Sol learns nothing. Asuka tricks Chaos into locking himself in an escape pod and ejecting onto the Earth below.

Ky and Jack-O' arrive at the White House, where Asuka reveals he intends to take the Tome and spend the rest of his life on the moon. Though he was believed to prepare to kill Sol, it turns out that Asuka planned to remove the Flame of Corruption from Sol's body, allowing Sol to live a normal life in a low profile as a regular scientist "Frederick Bulsara", and reconcile their friendships. Soldiers on the ground find that the "Chaos" in the escape pod is a brainwashed guard, and the real Chaos is still on the ship. Chaos steals the real Tome from Asuka's body and uses it to fuse with I-No, granting her godhood. I-No easily defeats the heroes and announces her intent to share her powers with the world, likely destroying it. Jack-O' attempts to sacrifice herself to stop I-No, but Sol prevents her on behalf of Aria's spirit to move on. Ky and Axl distract I-No while Vernon and Sol use the pack of Spiritas 48 from White House's president room to strengthen his Outrage sword into a laser cannon. Nagoriyuki reveals Chaos' true weakness is on his right palm and helps Sol get a powered-up shot on her, mortally wounding I-No. In her last moments, I-No realizes Axl was the blonde man from her past and dies happy having finally realized what she wanted in life.

In the aftermath, "Sol" is given a funeral, having retired as a scientist under his original name, Frederick. He lives with Jack-O' and works on a rocket to visit Asuka, who now hosts a radio show. Axl reunites with Megumi, his lover from the past and I-No's alternate past-self, implied to have received time travel abilities from her fallen future counterpart. A montage shows the fates of various Guilty Gear characters. In a post-credits scene, it is revealed that Chaos survived the fusion, and appears alone on an unknown beach.

Another Story
While the incident in America triggered by Asuka R. Kreutz’s surrender unfolds, Ramlethal Valentine, now a Special Brigade Commander of Illyria heads to the outskirts of the country after receiving a report of an emergency. There she finds a girl who closely resembles the late Bedman, who once worked with the possessed Universal Will/Ariels against mankind. That girl is Delilah, Bedman's twin sister who woke up after the death of her brother, now seeking to avenge her late brother by killing Happy Chaos. As a one-eyed and one-armed samurai woman named Baiken learned from Anji and Chipp about who Happy Chaos was, including his involvement on murdering her family, she was entrusted to look over Delilah by Anji, much to her dismay. However, the young girl ran away from Baiken, when Chaos activated "Tír na nÓg" during his invasion there.

While Baiken got an unexpected reinforcement from Ramlethal, Sin Kiske, the son of Ky Kiske and Dizzy, is now a knight of Illyria who accompanies Ramlethal on her mission while still retaining his royal status because of his parents’ current reputations. Baiken, Sin and Ramlethal enlist Faust, May and April to assist them stopping Delilah from endangering herself, because her power is unstable and would turn her into a suicide bomber. With the help of Bedman, whose soul now lives in his weaponized bed, Faust is able to administer a cure to permanently negate Delilah’s self destruct power at the cost of finally sacrificing Bedman and weakening Faust.

Sometime after the White House incident ended, the G4 World Peace summit succeeds and Delilah is cured. The Kiske main family members (Ky, Dizzy and Sin) greet the people of Illyria during an official peaceful ceremony.

Characters

Note: Bold denotes newcomers to the series

The game features fifteen playable characters in its base roster. Sol Badguy, Ky Kiske, May, Axl Low, Chipp Zanuff, Potemkin, Faust, Millia Rage, Zato-1, Ramlethal Valentine, Leo Whitefang, Anji Mito and I-No return from previous installments, while two new characters make their debut: these are Nagoriyuki, a Nightless vampire samurai who can drain opponents of their blood to increase his attack power, and Giovanna, a special operations unit officer who is accompanied by her wolf spirit, Rei.

More characters are planned for release as downloadable content, with five announced for Season Pass 1 on June 6, 2021, and four announced for Season Pass 2 on August 7, 2022. A third Season Pass was announced as well, but no further details were given.
 The first Season Pass 1 fighter, released on July 27, 2021, is Goldlewis Dickinson, the right-hand man of U.S. President Colin Vernon E. Groubitz, who fights alongside an alien spirit-filled coffin codenamed "Area 51 U.M.A.". The second fighter, released on August 27, 2021, is Jack-O', who debuted in Xrd. The third fighter, released on November 30, 2021, is the overarching antagonist of the series who was formally introduced in Strive, Happy Chaos. The fourth fighter, released on January 28, 2022, is Baiken, who debuted in the original Guilty Gear and returns as a DLC fighter from Rev 2. The last fighter for Season Pass 1 was revealed to be Testament, whose last appearance was in X2, released on March 31, 2022.
 The first Season Pass 2 fighter, announced on August 7, 2022 is Bridget, whose last appearance was in X2; the character was then released the day after on August 8, 2022. The second fighter, released on November 24, 2022, is Sin Kiske, who debuted in the second game Overture. The third fighters, "Bedman?", who is Bedman’s sentient weaponized bed robot accompanied by his sister Delilah, will be released on April 6th, 2023. The forth and final character will be released in May 2023.
 In the 2023 Arc World Tour Finals, the developers also confirmed that the third Season Pass has been in development.

Development
After a new installment in the Guilty Gear series was confirmed to be in development at EVO 2018 by Arc System Works, the game had its worldwide reveal and announcement trailer under the working title New Guilty Gear, showcasing the new Unreal Engine 4 graphics and Wall Break mechanic in EVO 2019. Two days later, the game's main theme song, "Smell of the Game", was fully revealed as a promotional single. The title Guilty Gear Strive was revealed in a trailer in November 2019.

According to director Akira Katano, the team aimed to appeal to more players by making the gameplay of Strive easier to comprehend compared to previous Guilty Gear games, instead of making it easier. He reasoned that with many fighting games, spectators and casual players would have a hard time understanding higher level play and lose interest in watching or improving. Unlike other entries, detailed explanations of the game's mechanics are absent from the game's tutorial as to "[...] show new players that it is possible to enjoy fighting games without knowing about the battle mechanics [...]". The game's network play also does not include a Ranked Mode, a gameplay mode in videogames that match players based on their skill level, measured by matches won, as to not force players to constantly improve against more skilled opponents and to play at their own pace.

The game was delayed in May 2020 to an unspecified 2021 release date due to the impact of the COVID-19 pandemic. After its first public beta went live during February 2021, the game was delayed from April 9, 2021, to June 11, with the development team citing adjustments to certain aspects of the game based on fan feedback for the reason behind its second delay. A second public beta was held during May 2021 to gather additional feedback.

The game was initially planned to be available at Japanese arcades on the same day as the home versions. In June 2021, Arc System Works has announced that the arcade release would be delayed, as testing the game on store locations proved difficult during the COVID-19 pandemic.

Release
Guilty Gear Strive released for the PlayStation 4, PlayStation 5, and Microsoft Windows on June 11, 2021. It was also distributed via Sega to Japanese arcades on July 29, 2021. "Limited Edition" and "Ultimate Edition" editions were made available for pre-order; console players who get the latter received early access to the full game on June 8, 2021. Cross-platform play was only supported between the PlayStation 4 and PlayStation 5 versions at launch. Cross-play with the Windows version is set to be added as an update alongside the Season Pass 2. Ver. 1.05 added Korean voices, marking the 3rd game in the franchise to have a Korean dub, alongside Guilty Gear X Plus and Guilty Gear X2 #Reload. Versions for Xbox One and Xbox Series X/S were announced at Tokyo Game Show 2022, and were released  on March 7, 2023.

Pre-release 
During the public beta phase, the game's netcode was highly praised by players.

Reception

Guilty Gear Strive received "generally favorable" reviews, according to review aggregator Metacritic. IGN said "Guilty Gear Strive is a milestone 2D fighting game that raises the bar for anime-like fighters in terms of its visuals, online netcode, and sheer creativity found in all aspects of its design." GameSpot said "If you're up for a challenge, or just want a cool, sharp-looking fighting game to mess around with, Strive knows all the right moves."

Sales 
The PlayStation 4 version of Guilty Gear: Strive sold 11,722 physical copies during its first week of release in Japan, making it the eighth bestselling retail game of the week in the country. During the same week, the PlayStation 5 version was the twenty-second bestselling retail game in Japan, with 3,547 physical copies being sold.

The game entered the UK physical charts at number 26. On Steam, the number of concurrent players reached a peak of 30,939, surpassing both Street Fighter V and Tekken 7.

The game sold 500,000 copies as of July 2021 and has sold one million copies as of August 2022, becoming the best-selling title of the franchise.

Notes

References

External links

2.5D fighting games
2021 video games
ALL.Net games
Arc System Works games
Arcade video games
D.I.C.E. Award for Fighting Game of the Year winners
Fighting games used at the Evolution Championship Series tournament
Guilty Gear games
Interactive Achievement Award winners
Multiplayer and single-player video games
PlayStation 4 games
PlayStation 5 games
The Game Awards winners
Transgender-related video games
Unreal Engine games
Video game sequels
Video games developed in Japan
Video games postponed due to the COVID-19 pandemic
Video games with 2.5D graphics
Video games with cel-shaded animation
Video games with cross-platform play
Windows games
Xbox One games
Xbox Series X and Series S games